Andrew Denson (November 16, 1965 - February 13, 2014) was a Major League Baseball first baseman. He played during two seasons at the major league level for the Atlanta Braves and Chicago White Sox. He was drafted by the Braves in the 1st round (19th pick) of the 1984 amateur draft.

Denson died on February 13, 2014, at the age of 48. Cause of death was not listed. Denson had a rare blood disease called amyloidosis, a condition in which abnormal protein deposits cause organs and tissues to deteriorate.

References

External links

Pelota Binaria (Venezuelan Winter League)

1965 births
2014 deaths
Acereros de Monclova players
African-American baseball players
American expatriate baseball players in Canada
American expatriate baseball players in Mexico
Atlanta Braves players
Baseball players from Cincinnati
Cardenales de Lara players
American expatriate baseball players in Venezuela
Chicago White Sox players
Deaths from amyloidosis
Diablos Rojos del México players
Durham Bulls players
Greenville Braves players
Gulf Coast Braves players
Indianapolis Indians players
Major League Baseball first basemen
Nashville Sounds players
Richmond Braves players
Rochester Red Wings players
Sumter Braves players
Vancouver Canadians players
20th-century African-American sportspeople
21st-century African-American people